The canton of Genlis is an administrative division of the Côte-d'Or department, eastern France. Its borders were modified at the French canton reorganisation which came into effect in March 2015. Its seat is in Genlis.

It consists of the following communes:
 
Aiserey
Beire-le-Fort
Bessey-lès-Cîteaux
Cessey-sur-Tille
Chambeire
Collonges-et-Premières
Échigey
Fauverney
Genlis
Izeure
Izier
Labergement-Foigney
Longchamp
Longeault-Pluvault
Longecourt-en-Plaine
Marliens
Pluvet
Rouvres-en-Plaine
Tart
Tart-le-Bas
Thorey-en-Plaine
Varanges

References

Cantons of Côte-d'Or